Brian Garvey (born 3 July 1937) is an English former footballer who played as a defender in the Football League.

Career
Born in Kingston upon Hull, Garvey joined his hometown club Hull City in 1957, making over 200 league appearances. He joined Watford in 1965 making just under 200 league appearances and helped the team win the Third Division championship in 1969. He moved to his final club Colchester United in 1970, assisting the U's to a Watney Cup win in 1971. He left Colchester in 1972, and went on to play for non-league clubs Bedford Town (where he was player-manager until March 1973) and Romford.

After retiring, Garvey had spells coaching at Wolves and Arsenal. He then emigrated to Melbourne in the 1980s and became the coach of power club Heidelberg United in the NSL from 1984–1988. After retiring from coaching Garvey was employed as a security guard.

Honours

Club
Watford
 Football League Third Division Winner (1): 1968–69

Colchester United
 Watney Cup Winner (1): 1971

References

External links
 
 

1937 births
English footballers
Association football defenders
Colchester United F.C. players
Hull City A.F.C. players
Bedford Town F.C. players
Bedford Town F.C. managers
Romford F.C. players
Watford F.C. players
Arsenal F.C. non-playing staff
English Football League players
Living people
Association football midfielders
English football managers